Mecynothrips is a genus of thrips in the family Phlaeothripidae, first described by Richard Siddoway Bagnall in 1908. The type species is Mecynothrips wallacei .

Two of the Australian species are found only in rainforests in northern Queensland (Mecynothrips acanthus, and Mecynothrips wallacei).  but the third Australian species, M.hardyi lives on the dead leaves of Acacia harpophylla in arid parts of southern Queensland.

Species
 Mecynothrips acanthus
 Mecynothrips atratus
 Mecynothrips goliath
 Mecynothrips hardyi
 Mecynothrips kanoi
 Mecynothrips karimonensis
 Mecynothrips kraussi
 Mecynothrips lacerta
 Mecynothrips priesneri
 Mecynothrips pugilator
 Mecynothrips simplex
 Mecynothrips snodgrassi
 Mecynothrips taiwanus
 Mecynothrips wallacei

References

Further reading 

 Lucid key factsheet for Mecynothrips

Phlaeothripidae
Thrips
Thrips genera
Animals described in 1908
Taxa named by Richard Siddoway Bagnall